Basal cell may refer to:

 the epidermal cell in the stratum basale
 the airway basal cell, an epithelial cell in the respiratory epithelium